Mülazım was a junior officer rank in the armed forces of the late Ottoman empire, equivalent to lieutenant. There were usually two grades:
Mülâzım-ı evvel, or first lieutenant;
Mülâzım-ı sani, or second lieutenant.
However, a number of military reforms affected military ranks (and their names and uniforms) through the history of the Ottoman empire.

History
In James Henry Skene's 1851 review of the Ottoman military, he noted that Mulazim were paid 280-350 piastres per month (including rations), perhaps more than contemporary British soldiers; as officers, their European-influenced uniforms included gold epaulettes, and distinctive lace on their cuffs as a mark of rank.

Influences
In mahdist usage, a Mülazım was a member of the khalifa's bodyguard. 
Ranks in the army of the Egyptian Kingdom were influenced by its Ottoman history; the lowest commissioned officer ranks were Mulazim Tani and Mulazim Awwal.

References

Military ranks of the Ottoman Empire
Turkish words and phrases